Lituites is an extinct nautiloid genus from the Middle Ordovician and type for the Lituitidae (a tarphycerid family) that in some more recent taxonomies has been classified with the orthocerids and listed under the order Lituitida. Fossils have been found in New York, Argentina, Norway, Sweden, Estonia, and China. 

Lituites produced a shell with a planospirally coiled juvenile portion at the apex, reflective of its tarphycerid ancestry, followed by a long, moderately expanding, generally straight, orthoconic adult section with a subdorsal siphuncle connecting the chambers. The adult body chamber may equal or exceed the length of the chambered part of the orthoconic section. The mature aperture has a pair of pronounced ventrolateral lappets and a similar but shorter pair of dorsolateral lappets.

Lituites gives its name to the term "lituiticone" which refers to a shell that is coiled in the early growth stage and later becomes uncoiled.

References  
Flower & Kummel, 1950. A Classification of the Nautiloidia. Jour Paleontology, V.24, N.5, pp 604–616, Sept
Furnish & Glenister, 1964, Nautiloidea -Tarphycerida. Treatise on Invertebrate Paleontology Part K... Nautiloidea
Mutvei, H. 2002. Connecting ring structure and its significance for classification of the orthoceratid cephalopods. Acta Palaeontologica Polonica 47 (1): 157–168.	

Nautiloids
Ordovician cephalopods
Ordovician animals of Asia
Ordovician Argentina